Chemokine (C motif) ligand 2 (XCL2) is a small cytokine belonging to the XC chemokine family that is highly related to another chemokine called XCL1.  It is predominantly expressed in activated T cells, but can also be found at low levels in unstimulated cells. XCL2 induces chemotaxis of cells expressing the chemokine receptor XCR1. Its gene is located on chromosome 1 in humans.

References

Cytokines